In popular psychology, a quarter-life crisis is a crisis "involving anxiety over the direction and quality of one's life" which is most commonly experienced in a period ranging from a person's early twenties up to their mid-thirties (although a quarter-life crisis can begin as early as 18). It is defined by clinical psychologist Alex Fowke as "a period of insecurity, doubt and disappointment surrounding your career, relationships and financial situation".

Aspects
According to Meredith Goldstein of The Boston Globe, the quarter-life crisis occurs in one's twenties, usually after entering the "real world" (i.e., after graduating college, and/or after moving out of the family home). German psychologist Erik Erikson, who proposed eight crises that humans face during their development, proposed the existence of a life crisis occurring at this age. The conflict he associated with young adulthood is the Intimacy vs. Isolation crisis. According to Erikson, after establishing a personal identity in adolescence, young adults seek to form intense, usually romantic relationships with other people.

Common symptoms of a quarter-life crisis are often feelings of being "lost, scared, lonely or confused" about what steps to take in early adulthood. Studies have shown that unemployment and choosing a career path is a major cause of stress and anxiety in young adults. Early stages of one living on their own for the first time and learning to cope without parental help can also induce feelings of isolation and loneliness. Re-evaluation of one's close personal relationships can also be a factor, with sufferers feeling they have outgrown their partner or believing others may be more suitable for them.

Recently, millennials have occasionally been referred to as the Boomerang Generation or Peter Pan Generation, because of the members' perceived penchant for delaying some rites of passage into adulthood for longer periods than previous generations. These labels were also a reference to a trend toward members returning home after college and/or living with their parents for longer periods than previous generations. These tendencies might also be partly explained by changes in external social factors rather than characteristics intrinsic to millennials (e.g., higher cost of living and higher levels of student loan debt in the US among millennials when compared to earlier generations can make it more difficult for young adults to achieve traditional markers of independence such as marriage, home ownership or investing).

In film
The notion of the quarter-life crisis is explored by the 1967 film The Graduate, one of the first film depictions of this issue. Other notable films that also do so are Bright Lights, Big City; The Paper Chase; St. Elmo's Fire; How to Be; Reality Bites; Garden State; Accepted; Ghost World; High Fidelity; (500) Days of Summer; Lost in Translation; Silver Linings Playbook; Vicky Cristina Barcelona; Amélie; and Shaun of the Dead; as well as the musical Avenue Q, in the television show The Office,  and the HBO television series Girls. The 2008 web series Quarterlife was so named for the phenomenon. Other movies exploring the quarter-life crisis include: Tiny Furniture, The Puffy Chair, Fight Club, Stranger than Fiction, Greenberg, Frances Ha and Eternal Sunshine of the Spotless Mind. A 2014 comedy directed by Lynn Shelton titled Laggies delves into the complexities of a quarter-life crisis. The 2nd season of 2021's Cubicles revolved majorly on quarter life crisis psychology, its symptoms, effects and ways to deal with them.

In music
The 2003 John Mayer single "Why Georgia" explores the concept of a quarter-life crisis. The song was based upon John Mayer's experiences during this age period, when he moved to Georgia.

The 1975 Fleetwood Mac song "Landslide", written by Stevie Nicks in her late twenties, explores many of the self-doubts and fears of the quarter-life crisis, at a time when Nicks professed to be uncertain about her musical career and her romantic life.

English indie rock band Spector's song "True Love (For Now)", the opening track to their 2012 album Enjoy It While It Lasts, references a quarter-life crisis.

"20 Something", the final track on SZAs 2017 album Ctrl, delves into the many insecurities she experienced in her twenties, both personal and professional, and the urgency she felt to make the most of her life before entering into mature adulthood.

In the album "Pep talks" by Judah & the Lion lead single “Quarter-Life Crisis” is about the ensuing rootlessness and insecurity that Akers, band's lead vocalist, felt during his twenties, caused by loss of his aunt and his parent's divorce.

The 2020 released EP "Young Life Crisis" by UPSAHL is about a breakup, lost friendships and a canceled tour, all during the coronavirus pandemic and the uncertainness around her life.

See also

 Existential crisis
 Midlife crisis

References

Further reading

 Barr, Damian. Get It Together: A Guide to Surviving Your Quarterlife Crisis. Hodder & Stoughton Paperbacks, 2004. .
 Hassler, Christine. 20-Something, 20-Everything: A Quarter-life Woman's Guide to Balance and Direction. New World Library, 2005. .
 Hassler, Christine. 20-Something Manifesto: Quarter-Lifers Speak Out About Who They Are, What They Want, and How to Get It. New World Library, 2008. .
 Pollak, Lindsey. Getting from College to Career: 90 Things to Do Before You Join the Real World. Collins Business, 2007. .
 Robbins, Alexandra. Conquering Your Quarterlife Crisis: Advice from Twentysomethings Who Have Been There and Survived. Perigee, 2004. .
 Robbins, Alexandra; Wilner, Abby. Quarterlife Crisis: The Unique Challenges of Life in Your Twenties. Tarcher, 2001. .
 Wilner, Abby; Stocker, Catherine. Quarterlifer's Companion: How to Get on the Right Career Path, Control Your Finances, and Find the Support Network You Need to Thrive. McGraw-Hill, 2004. .

External links
 Does graduation mark the start of your quarter-life crisis?
 Life is hard when you're in your 20s - BBC News
 Quarter Life Crisis And How To Beat It - Article By Divya Toshniwal

Human development
Young adult